Naše novine was a bi-monthly magazine from Subotica in Bačka. The magazine was being published during Austro-Hungarian administration, from 1907 to 1918.

Naše novine was the official organ of Land's Christian Socialist Party (Zemaljska kršćansko-socijalna stranka). The magazine dealt with political, economical and social topics. It was printed in Croatian.

The first edition was published on 4 December 1907. From 1908 the magazine was printed weekly. In 1918 the magazine ended publication.

Editors
The editors were Blaško Rajić, Josip Mamužić, Matija Čatalinac, Ivan Petreš Čudomil, Bela Mesaroš and Stipan Subotički.

References

Croatian-language magazines
Croats of Vojvodina
Defunct magazines published in Serbia
Defunct political magazines
Magazines established in 1907
Magazines disestablished in 1918
Mass media in Subotica
Magazines published in Serbia
Bi-monthly magazines
Weekly magazines